Ozolotepec Zapotec is a Zapotec language spoken in southern Oaxaca, Mexico. It is partially intelligible with Cuixtla Zapotec and Loxicha Zapotec.

Some towns named Ozolotepec speak Xanaguía Zapotec or Xanica Zapotec.

References

Zapotec languages